Ivan Šaranić (born 12 May 2003) is a Croatian footballer who plays for Varaždin, on loan from Dinamo Zagreb, as a midfielder.

Club career
On 16 December 2020, Šaranić made his professional debut for Dinamo Zagreb, coming on as a substitute for Iyayi Atiemwen in the 84th minute in a Croatian Cup match against Rudeš. On 12 May 2021, he debuted in the Croatian First League during a 2–2 draw against Varaždin.

International career
Šaranić has played internationally for Croatia at all youth levels from under-14 to under-20.

References

External links
 

2003 births
Living people
People from Sisak
Croatian footballers
Croatia youth international footballers
Croatian expatriate footballers
Association football midfielders
First Football League (Croatia) players
Croatian Football League players
Slovenian PrvaLiga players
GNK Dinamo Zagreb players
GNK Dinamo Zagreb II players
NK Bravo players
NK Varaždin (2012) players
Croatian expatriate sportspeople in Slovenia
Expatriate footballers in Slovenia